Roman Khodin (born 6 September 1993) is a Russian rugby union player who generally plays as a lock represents Russia internationally.

He was included in the Russian squad for the 2019 Rugby World Cup which is scheduled to be held in Japan for the first time and also marks his first World Cup appearance.

Career 
He made his international debut for Russia against Namibia on 10 November 2018.

References 

Russian rugby union players
Russia international rugby union players
Living people
1993 births
Rugby union locks